Established in 1961, M.S.P. Mandal's Shri Shivaji College is the oldest college in Parbhani. It is run by Marathwada Shikshan Prasarak Mandal, Aurangabad. The college is affiliated to Swami Ramanand Teerth Marathwada University. It is the highest performing college in the university jurisdiction in NAAC A&A with 3.52 CGPA and A+ grade ( from Jan 2017). UGC has also identified it as a College with Potential for Excellence (CPE) Institution. It has plus two, UG, PG and PhD programs in Arts, Science, and Commerce.

References

External links

Universities and colleges in Maharashtra
Educational institutions established in 1961
1961 establishments in Maharashtra
Parbhani
Monuments and memorials to Shivaji